Events in the year 1918 in Brazil.

Incumbents

Federal government 
 President: Venceslau Brás (until 14 November); Delfim Moreira (acting; from 15 November) 
 Vice President: Urbano Santos da Costa Araújo (until 14 November); Delfim Moreira (from 15 November)

Governors 
 Alagoas: João Batista Accioli Jr. (till 12 June); José Fernandes de Barros Lima (from 12 June)
 Amazonas: Pedro de Alcântara Bacelar
 Bahia: Antônio Ferrão Muniz de Aragão
 Ceará: João Tomé de Sabóia e Silva
 Goiás:
 until 21 December: João Alves de Castro
 from 21 December: Joaquim Rufino Ramos Jubé
 Maranhão:
 until 1 March: Antônio Brício de Araújo
 1 March - 9 October: José Joaquim Marques
 9 October - 21 October: Raul da Cunha Machado
 from 21 October: Urbano Santos
 Mato Grosso: Cipriano da Costa Ferreira, then Francisco de Aquino Correia
 Minas Gerais: 
 until 7 September: Delfim Moreira
 from 7 September: Artur Bernardes
 Pará: Lauro Sodré
 Paraíba: Francisco Camilo de Holanda
 Paraná: Afonso Camargo
 Pernambuco: Manuel Antônio Pereira Borba
 Piauí: Eurípedes Clementino de Aguiar
 Rio Grande do Norte: Joaquim Ferreira Chaves
 Rio Grande do Sul: Antônio Augusto Borges de Medeiros
 Santa Catarina:
 São Paulo: 
 Sergipe:

Vice governors 
 Rio Grande do Norte:
 São Paulo:

Events 

30 January - Ministerial Notice No. 501 is issued, establishing the Naval Division for War Operations (Divisão Naval em Operações de Guerra - DNOG).
1 March - Brazilian general election, 1918: Former president Rodrigues Alves receives 99.1% of the vote.
June - The Brazilian battleship São Paulo is sent to the USA for a full refit.
18 August - The Brazilian Medical Mission, led by Dr. Nabuco Gouveia and directed by General Aché, is established with 86 doctors.
24 September - The Brazilian Medical Mission lands at Marseilles, France, and supports the local population during a flu outbreak, ensuring the continuity of logistical support to the troops at the front.
15 November - President-elect Rodrigues Alves, suffering from influenza, is unable to take office on the scheduled date, and is replaced by Vice President Delfim Moreira.

Births 
15 January - João Figueiredo, military leader and politician (died 1999)
21 February - Alberto Ruschel, actor (died 1996)
1 March - João Goulart, 24th President of Brazil (died 1976)
24 July - Antonio Candido, writer, academic, sociologist and literary critic (died 2017)
28 October - José Leite Lopes, physicist (died 2006)

Deaths 
1 November - Eurípedes Barsanulfo, educator, pharmacist, politician and prominent spiritualist medium (born 1880) 
27 November - Belfort Duarte, footballer (born 1883; murdered)
28 December - Olavo Bilac, Parnassian poet, journalist and translator (born 1865)

References

See also 
1918 in Brazilian football

 
1910s in Brazil
Years of the 20th century in Brazil
Brazil
Brazil